The following is a list of people executed by the U.S. state of Delaware since capital punishment was resumed in 1976.

All of the 16 people were convicted of murder and have been executed at the James T. Vaughn Correctional Center, near Smyrna, Delaware. Capital punishment was abolished in Delaware on August 2, 2016.

See also 
 Capital punishment in Delaware
 Capital punishment in the United States

References

External links 
 Delaware Department of Correction

Delaware
People executed by Delaware